The McRoberts maneuver is an obstetrical maneuver used to assist in childbirth. It is  named after William A. McRoberts, Jr. It is employed in case of shoulder dystocia during childbirth and involves hyperflexing the mother's legs tightly to her abdomen. It is effective due to the increased mobility at the sacroiliac joint during pregnancy, allowing rotation of the pelvis and facilitating the release of the fetal shoulder. If this maneuver does not succeed, an assistant applies pressure on the lower abdomen (suprapubic pressure). Current guidelines strongly recommend against pulling on the infants head, as this could lead to brachial plexus injury. Instead, support while keeping the neck straight is indicated. The technique is effective in about 42% of cases.  Note that suprapubic pressure and McRobert's maneuver together will resolve 90% of cases.

See also 
 Wood's screw maneuver
 Zavanelli maneuver
 Shoulder dystocia
 Treatment of shoulder dystocia
 The mechanics of birth

References

Childbirth
Obstetrical procedures